General Twining may refer to:

Merrill B. Twining (1902–1996), U.S. Marine Corps general
Nathan F. Twining (1897–1982), U.S. Air Force general
Philip Geoffrey Twining (1862–1920), Canadian-born British Army general